Roger Kelsey Marklew (30 January 1940 – December 2006) was an English professional footballer who played as a winger.

References

1940 births
2006 deaths
Footballers from Sheffield
English footballers
Association football wingers
Penistone Church F.C. players
Sheffield United F.C. players
Sheffield Wednesday F.C. players
Accrington Stanley F.C. (1891) players
Grimsby Town F.C. players
English Football League players